Hedeoma patens (Spanish common name, 'small oregano') is a small herb in the genus Hedeoma, family Lamiaceae. It is native to the Mexican states of Chihuahua and Coahuila. It is not very closely related to true oregano.

Uses
The plant is highly aromatic. It is used by natives of northwestern Mexico to flavor various food items, especially beans.

See also
 Coleus amboinicus, known as Cuban oregano,  ('pennyroyal oregano'),  ('French oregano'), Mexican mint, Mexican thyme, and many other names. Common throughout the tropics, including Latin America, but probably of eastern-hemisphere origin.

References

patens
Flora of Northeastern Mexico
Plants described in 1908